Andrew McClay is a former extra on Game of Thrones who gained considerable prominence for his depiction in the Game of Thrones: The Last Watch documentary.  Director Jeanie Finlay said about McClay: “I’ve found the heart of our film.”   McClay first appeared as a Baratheon soldier in Season 5, who later becomes a Stark bannerman in Seasons 6, 7, and 8.  McClay revealed in Game of Thrones: The Last Watch that his character's name across all 4 seasons was Aberdolf Strongbeard.

References

External links
 

1984 births
Living people
Irish male television actors
21st-century Irish male actors